The Ministry of Treasury and Finance is a  government ministry office of the Republic of Turkey, responsible for finance and tax affairs in Turkey. The current minister is Nureddin Nebati since December 2, 2021.

Departments
The following departments are subordinate to the Ministry of Finance:

 Debt Office
 Tax Inspection Board
 Strategy Development Unit
 Directorate General of Budget and Fiscal Control
 Directorate General of Revenue Policies
 Department of the European Union and Foreign Affairs 
 Ministry of Finance Centre for Higher Training
 Financial Crimes Investigation Board
 Chief Legal Advisory and Directorate General of Proceedings
 Directorate General of Public Accounts
 Directorate General of National Property
 Directorate General of Personnel
 Department of Administrative and Financial Affairs

See also
List of Finance Ministers of Turkey
Ministry of Finance (Ottoman Empire)

References

External links
 Ministry of Finance and Treasury
 

Finance
Turkey
Ministries established in 1923
1923 establishments in Turkey